Trowbridge railway station is a railway station on the Wessex Main Line serving the town of Trowbridge in Wiltshire, England.

Originally opened by the Wilts, Somerset and Weymouth Railway in 1848 as part of their Thingley Junction to Westbury line, it gained a link to Bath and Bristol nine years later thanks to the Great Western Railway.  This is now the main line, as the original route to  has been singled and reduced to secondary status.

Description
The small station building is located on the northbound platform (platform 1). This platform is for trains to Bath, Bristol and Cardiff. Platform 2, on the southbound line is for trains to Westbury, London and the South Coast.

The station building contains a staffed ticket office, benches, vending machines, one electronic information sign, timetable information, bus timetable information and free leaflets, toilet facilities and Free Metro newspapers are available. On Platform 1 there are Two electronic information signs, covered bike stands, benches, shelter with benches, one self-service ticket machine. Platform 2 has a two electronic display signs, covered bike racks, train timetables, a shelter with benches, one self-service ticket machine, public telephone and taxi hiring.

Services

The original WS&WR line diverges to the north of Trowbridge, formerly carried a limited passenger service (two per day each way Mon-Sat, one each way on Sundays) to/from  via  and Chippenham. This was improved to a two-hourly service (8 trains each way total on weekdays, 5 each way on Sundays) at the December 2013 timetable change.

References

Former Great Western Railway stations
Railway stations in Great Britain opened in 1848
Railway stations in Wiltshire
Railway stations served by Great Western Railway
Trowbridge
DfT Category D stations